Goblins is a webcomic by Ellipsis Stephens.

Premise 
Goblins started in 2005 and as of 2022 is still updating. It is part of Hiveworks Comics.

The comic's setting is based on a Dungeons & Dragons role-playing game and parodies these games, in that the rules of reality follow game mechanics; characters are aware of this and can take advantage of these rules. The story follows both a group of goblins, including Chief, Big Ears, Fumbles, Thaco and Complains-of-Names. It also follows Minmax and Forgath, "adventurers" based on RPG player characters. Goblins mixes comedy with bleak situations and gruesome violence.

Reception 
Goblins won the 2011 and 2012 Aurora Awards, a Canadian literary award, for Best English Graphic Novel.

References

External links 
Official website

2000s webcomics
2005 webcomic debuts
2010s webcomics
Canadian webcomics
Fantasy webcomics
Long-form webcomics